The Kennedy family is an American political family that has long been prominent in American politics, public service, entertainment, and business. In 1884, 35 years after the family's arrival from Ireland, Patrick Joseph "P. J." Kennedy became the first Kennedy elected to public office, serving in the Massachusetts state legislature until 1895. At least one Kennedy family member served in federal elective office from 1947, when P. J. Kennedy's grandson John F. Kennedy became a member of Congress from Massachusetts, until 2011, when Patrick J. Kennedy II (John's nephew) retired as a member of the U.S. House of Representatives from Rhode Island. 

P. J.'s son Joseph P. Kennedy Sr. had nine children with his wife Rose Fitzgerald Kennedy, including John F. Kennedy, who served in both houses of the United States Congress and as U.S. President; Robert F. Kennedy, who served as U.S. Attorney General and in the U.S. Senate; and Edward M. "Ted" Kennedy, who served more than 46 years in the U.S. Senate. Other descendants include members of the U.S. House of Representatives and Senate, two U.S. ambassadors, one U.S. envoy, a lieutenant governor, three state legislators (one of whom also served in the U.S. House of Representatives), and one mayor.

Joseph and Rose's daughter, Eunice, founded the National Institute of Child Health and Human Development (part of the National Institutes of Health), and the Special Olympics. Eunice's daughter, Maria Shriver, served as First Lady of California. Other descendants of Joseph and Rose Kennedy have been active as lawyers, authors, and activists on behalf of those with physical and intellectual disabilities.

History
According to genealogist Brian Kennedy in his work JFK's Irish O'Kennedy Ancestors, the Kennedys who would go on to play a significant role in the United States of America, originated from an Irish clan called Ó Cinnéide Fionn (one of the three Irish Gaelic Ó Cinnéide clans who ruled the kingdom of Ormond, along with the Ó Cinnéide Donn and Ó Cinnéide Ruadh). Their progenitor, Diarmaid Ó Cinnéide Fionn, held Knigh Castle close to what is today Puckane, County Tipperary in 1546. From there, having lost out to the New English order in the Kingdom of Ireland, they ended up in Dunganstown, New Ross, County Wexford by 1740. Patrick Kennedy was born there in 1823.

Patrick Kennedy (1823–1858) and Bridget Murphy (1824–1888) sailed from Ireland to East Boston in 1849. Patrick worked in East Boston as a barrel maker, or cooper, and had five children with Bridget. Their youngest, Patrick Joseph "P. J." Kennedy, went into business and served in the Massachusetts state legislature from 1884 to 1895.

P. J. and Mary Augusta Hickey were the parents of four children. Their oldest was Joseph Patrick "Joe" Kennedy Sr., who amassed a fortune in banking and securities trading, which he further expanded by investing in filmmaking, real estate and liquor importation. He founded Somerset Importers and owned the Merchandise Mart in Chicago, Illinois.

Joseph Sr. was appointed by President Franklin D. Roosevelt as the first chairman of the Securities and Exchange Commission, chairman of the Maritime Commission, and U.S. Ambassador to the United Kingdom in the lead-up to World War II. He served on The Hoover Commission, officially named the Commission on Organization of the Executive Branch of the Government, from 1947 to 1949; the commission was appointed by President Harry Truman to recommend administrative changes in the federal government. His wife, Rose Elizabeth Fitzgerald, was appointed Papal Countess of the Holy Roman Church by Pope Pius XII.

Continued public service
Joseph P. Kennedy Sr. and Rose Elizabeth Fitzgerald were the parents of nine children: Joseph Jr., John, Rose Marie (called Rosemary), Kathleen, Eunice, Patricia, Robert, Jean, and Edward (called Ted). John served as the 35th president of the United States, while Robert and Ted both became prominent senators. 

Every Kennedy elected to public office has served as a Democrat, while other members of the family have worked for the Democratic Party or held Cabinet posts in Democratic administrations. Many have attended Harvard University, and the family has contributed greatly to that university's John F. Kennedy School of Government.

Joseph Sr. expected his eldest son, Joseph Jr., to go into politics and to ultimately be elected president. Joseph Jr. was elected as a delegate to the 1940 Democratic National Convention and enlisted in the Navy after the U.S. entered World War II. He was killed in 1944 when the bomber he was piloting exploded in flight. Joseph Sr.'s desire to see the family involved in politics and government then focused on John, who had considered a career as a journalist, having authored a book and done some reporting for Hearst Newspapers. After returning from Navy service, John served in the U.S. House of Representatives representing Massachusetts's 11th congressional district from 1947-1953, and then as U.S. Senator from Massachusetts until his election as President in 1960.

During John's administration, Robert served as attorney general; his brother-in-law Sargent Shriver served as director of the new Peace Corps, and Ted was elected to the U.S. Senate, occupying his brother's former seat in Massachusetts until his death in 2009.

Among the Kennedy administration's accomplishments: the Alliance for Progress, the Peace Corps, peaceful resolution to the Cuban Missile Crisis, the Nuclear Test Ban Treaty of 1963, the 24th Amendment ending the poll tax, and the Civil Rights Act of 1964. The family was the subject of intense media coverage during and after the Kennedy presidency, often emphasizing their relative youth, allure, education, and future in politics. 

Ted served in the Senate with his brother Robert (1965–1968), and was serving in the Senate when his nephew, Joseph P. II (1987–1999), and son, Patrick J. (1995–2011), served in the U.S. House of Representatives. 

In November 2012, Joseph P. Kennedy III, son of former Rep. Joseph P. Kennedy II and grandson of the late Sen. Robert F. Kennedy, was elected to the U.S. House of Representatives from Massachusetts's 4th congressional district. In 2020, he lost the 2020 Senate primary election in Massachusetts to Ed Markey, the first Kennedy to ever lose an election in the state.

In the 2020s, three Kennedy family members were serving as U.S. ambassadors or envoys. Victoria Reggie Kennedy, second wife of Ted Kennedy, was named in 2021 by President Biden as U.S. ambassador to Austria. Caroline Kennedy, daughter of President Kennedy, was named in 2022 by President Biden as U.S. ambassador to Australia; she previously served as U.S. ambassador to Japan under President Barack Obama. In the same year, Joseph P. Kennedy III was named by President Biden as U.S. special envoy to Northern Ireland.

Curse

Family incidents led Senator Ted Kennedy to wonder, in a televised statement about the Chappaquiddick incident in 1969, whether "some awful curse did actually hang over all the Kennedys." Some of the events endured by the Kennedy clan include: 

In 1941, Rosemary underwent a non-consensual lobotomy intended to correct her violent mood swings, convulsions, and intellectual disability. The operation left her incapacitated for the rest of her life. Joseph Jr. died in 1944 when the Navy bomber he was piloting exploded in mid-flight. Kathleen died in a plane crash in France in 1948. 

John and Robert were assassinated, in 1963 and 1968 respectively. In 1964, Ted was nearly killed when his plane crashed in an apple orchard near Southampton, Massachusetts. (Legislative aide Edward Moss and the pilot were killed in the crash.) Ted was seriously injured and spent months in a hospital recovering from a severe back injury, a punctured lung, broken ribs and internal bleeding.

In later generations, Robert's son David died of a drug overdose in 1984; another son, Michael, died from injuries sustained in a skiing accident in 1997. John's son, John Jr., died in a plane crash (along with his wife Carolyn and sister-in-law Lauren) off the coast of Martha's Vineyard in 1999. Ted's daughter Kara and Pat's son Christopher died of heart attacks, in 2011 and 2018 respectively.

Robert's granddaughter, Saoirse Kennedy Hill, died of a drug overdose in 2019 aged 22. In April 2020, another granddaughter, Maeve Kennedy McKean, a senior advisor for human rights in the Obama administration, and her eight-year-old son, Gideon Joseph Kennedy McKean, disappeared in Chesapeake Bay after embarking in a canoe to retrieve a ball. Maeve McKean's body was recovered the following week, and her son's two days later, about 2.5 miles from her mother's home on the Chesapeake Bay.

Genealogy

Government offices held
 Patrick Joseph Kennedy: Massachusetts state Representative 1884–1889; Massachusetts state Senator, 1889–1895.
Joseph Patrick Kennedy Sr.: Chairman of the U.S. Securities and Exchange Commission, 1934–1935; chairman of the United States Maritime Commission, 1936–1938; United States Ambassador to the United Kingdom, 1938–1940.
John Fitzgerald Kennedy: United States Representative from Massachusetts, 1947–1953; United States Senator from Massachusetts, 1953–1960; President of the United States, 1961–1963.
Caroline Kennedy: United States Ambassador to Japan, 2013–2017; United States Ambassador to Australia 2022-.
Eunice Kennedy Shriver
Bobby Shriver: Santa Monica, California City Council member, 2004–2012; Mayor of Santa Monica, 2010.
Mark Kennedy Shriver: Maryland state Delegate, 1995–2003.
Robert Francis Kennedy: United States Attorney General 1961–1964; United States Senator from New York, 1965–1968.
Kathleen Kennedy Townsend: Lieutenant governor of Maryland, 1995–2003.
Joseph P. Kennedy II: United States Representative from Massachusetts, 1987–1999.
Joseph P. Kennedy III: United States Representative from Massachusetts, 2013–2021; U.S. envoy to Northern Ireland, 2022-.
Jean Kennedy Smith: United States Ambassador to Ireland, 1993–1998.
Edward Moore Kennedy: United States Senator from Massachusetts, 1962–2009.
Edward M. Kennedy Jr.: Connecticut state Senator, 2015–2019.
Patrick J. Kennedy: Rhode Island state Representative, 1989–1993; United States Representative from Rhode Island, 1995–2011.

There was a member of the Kennedy family in public office nearly continuously from 1946, when John F. Kennedy was elected to the U.S. House of Representatives, until early 2011, when Patrick J. Kennedy left the House. The only exception was the period between John F. Kennedy's resignation from the Senate on December 22, 1960, and his assumption of the office of President on January 20, 1961. In 2013, two years after Patrick Kennedy left the House, Joseph P. Kennedy III was elected U.S. Representative from Massachusetts and served until 2021. Below is a timeline of the Kennedys' tenure in the U.S. Congress.

Timeline

Heraldry
In 1961, John F. Kennedy was presented with a grant of arms for all the descendants of Patrick Kennedy (1823–1858) from the Chief Herald of Ireland. The design of the arms (three gold closed helmets on a black field) strongly alludes to symbols in the coats of arms of the O'Kennedys of Ormonde and the FitzGeralds of Desmond, from whom the family is descended. The crest is an armored hand holding four arrows between two olive branches, elements taken from the coat of arms of the United States of America and also symbolic of Kennedy and his brothers.

See also 

 List of Kennedy family members

References

Bibliography 
 
 Haas, Lawrence J. The Kennedys in the World: How Jack, Bobby, and Ted Remade America's Empire (2021) excerpt
 Hunt, Amber, and David Batcher. Kennedy Wives: Triumph and Tragedy in America's Most Public Family (2014) excerpt 
 Kessler, Ronald. The sins of the father: Joseph P. Kennedy and the dynasty he founded (St. Martin's Press, 1996).

 Klein, Edward. The Kennedy Curse: Why tragedy has haunted America's first family for 150 years (Macmillan, 2003).

 Leamer, Laurence. The Kennedy women: The saga of an American family (Ballantine Books, 1996). excerpt
 Leamer, Laurence. The Kennedy Men: 1901-1963 (2001) excerpt
 Leamer, Laurence. Sons of Camelot: The Fate of an American Dynasty (2005) excerpt
 Nasaw, David. The Patriarch: The Remarkable Life and Turbulent Times of Joseph P. Kennedy (2012); scholarly biography.

External links

 The Kennedys: A Family Tree, St. Petersburg Times
 Kennedy Family Tree, The New York Times
 Kennedy Family, The Political Graveyard

 
American families of Irish ancestry
Business families of the United States
First Families of the United States
Roman Catholic families
County Wexford
Irish-American culture
Irish-American history
Massachusetts Democrats
People from Barnstable, Massachusetts
People from Boston
People from Brookline, Massachusetts